Georges Chometon (born November 9, 1928 in Saint-Bonnet-le-Chastel (Puy-de-Dôme)), is a former French politician.

Biography

Georges Chometon's first career was as a butcher.

In 1953, Chometon married Ginette Chometon. The couple had four daughters and celebrated their 60th anniversary in July 2013.

Offices to which he was elected

Municipal council member in Saint-Bonnet-le-Chastel (Puy-de-Dôme) from 1953
Assistant mayor Saint-Bonnet-le-Chastel from 1959 to 1971
Mayor of Saint-Bonnet-le-Chastel starting1971
President of the Communauté de communes du Haut-Livradois from 2002 to present
General Conseiller from Puy-de-Dôme from 1973 to 2004, elected in the (canton de Saint-Germain-l'Herm). He lost on March 28, 2004 to a candidate representing the "various left" (divers gauche) who was 34 years his junior.
President of the Conseil général du Puy-de-Dôme de 1992 à 199x.
Representative to the National Assembly from Puy-de-Dôme from March 16, 1986 to June 12, 1988.

Political allegiance

Union gaulliste (led by René Capitant)
Mouvement républicain populaire (MRP)
centriste (center)
Centre of Social Democrats politicians (CDS) starting in 1978
President of the CDS departmental federation in 1992
 Union for French Democracy (while a representative 1986-1988)

References

1928 births
Living people
People from Puy-de-Dôme
Politicians from Auvergne-Rhône-Alpes
Popular Republican Movement politicians
Centre of Social Democrats politicians
Union for French Democracy politicians
Deputies of the 8th National Assembly of the French Fifth Republic
Mayors of places in Auvergne-Rhône-Alpes